Amt Kleine Elster (Niederlausitz) is an Amt ("collective municipality") in the district of Elbe-Elster, in Brandenburg, Germany. Its seat is in Massen-Niederlausitz.

The Amt Kleine Elster (Niederlausitz) consists of the following municipalities:
Crinitz
Lichterfeld-Schacksdorf
Massen-Niederlausitz
Sallgast

Demography 

Kleine Elster
Elbe-Elster